Local elections were held in Cabuyao on May 13, 2019, as part of the 2019 Philippine general election. The voters elected for the elective local posts in the city: the mayor, vice mayor, and ten councilors.

Overview
Incumbent Mayor Rommel Gecolea is seeking his second term under PDP–Laban with Councilor Leif Laiglon Opiña as his running mate. Their opponent is the tandem of Dennis Felipe Hain and Vice Mayor Jose Benson Aguillo of  Nacionalista Party.

Candidates

Results
Here are the official results of the election:

Mayor

Vice Mayor

Councilors

|-bgcolor=black
|colspan=8|

References

External links

2019 Philippine local elections
Elections in Cabuyao
2019 elections in Calabarzon